Elachista tanaella is a moth of the family Elachistidae. It is only known from northern Norway.

The forewings are unicolorous brownish grey. The hindwings are grey. Adults have been recorded in July.

The larvae feed on Carex rotundata. They mine the leaves of their host plant.

References

tanaella
Moths described in 2004
Endemic fauna of Norway
Moths of Europe
Insects of the Arctic